Thomas Williamson Sidney Hall (15 June 1908  – 1973) was an English footballer who played at left half in the Football League for Darlington.

Hall was born in Middleton St George, County Durham, the sixth child of Thomas Williamson Hall, a cab proprietor, and his wife Joanna. He scored once from 23 appearances in the Third Division North for Darlington during the 1929–30 and 1930–31 Football League seasons. He died in 1973 in Darlington, County Durham.

References

1908 births
1973 deaths
Footballers from Darlington
English footballers
Association football wing halves
Darlington F.C. players
English Football League players